Poo Manam is a 1989 Indian Tamil language film directed by S. Rajasekar and produced by S. Rajagopal. It stars Rajasekar and Mahalakshmi. The film was released on 1 January 1989.

Plot

Cast 
S. Rajasekar
Mahalakshmi
Janagaraj

Soundtrack 
The music was composed by Vidyasagar for the lyrics written by S. A. Rajkumar and Vaali. It was Vidyasagar's debut film.

References

External links 
 

1980s Tamil-language films
1989 films
Films scored by Vidyasagar